John A. McKay House and Manufacturing Company is a historic home and factory complex located at Dunn, Harnett County, North Carolina. The house was built about 1840, and is a two-story, double pile, Greek Revival style frame dwelling.  It features a full-facade, one-story porch and two-story, portico.  Associated with the house are a barn, later remodeled with garage doors, a smokehouse, a storage/wash house, and fence. The main factory building was built in 1903, and is a two-story U-shaped building, with a two-story shed, gable roofed ell, and another ell.  Other contributing factory buildings are an office (1937), two privies, McKay Manufacturing Company building (1910), trailer assembly room (c. 1930), steel house (1910), foundry (1910), cleaning rooms (1910), wood storage building (1935), boiler room (c. 1925), pattern room (c. 1925), and flask shop (1910).

It was listed on the National Register of Historic Places in 1986.

References

Houses on the National Register of Historic Places in North Carolina
Industrial buildings and structures on the National Register of Historic Places in North Carolina
Greek Revival houses in North Carolina
Houses completed in 1840
Industrial buildings completed in 1903
Houses in Harnett County, North Carolina
National Register of Historic Places in Harnett County, North Carolina